The 1920 United States presidential election in Wyoming took place on November 2, 1920, as part of the 1920 United States presidential election. State voters chose three representatives, or electors, to the Electoral College, who voted for president and vice president.

Wyoming was won by Republican Ohio Senator Warren G. Harding, running with governor of Massachusetts and the future 30th president of the United States Calvin Coolidge, with 64.15 percent of the popular vote, against the Democratic 46th and 48th Governor of Ohio James M. Cox, running with the future Governor of New York and 32nd President of the United States Franklin D. Roosevelt, with 31.86 percent of the popular vote.

Like all of the Western United States, severe anger at President Woodrow Wilson's failure to maintain his promise to keep the United States out of World War I produced extreme hostility among the strongly isolationist population of remote Wyoming. In addition, by the beginning of 1920 skyrocketing inflation and Wilson's focus upon his proposed League of Nations at the expense of domestic policy had helped make the incumbent president very unpopular – besides which Wilson also had major health problems that had left First Lady Edith effectively running the nation. Political unrest seen in the Palmer Raids and the "Red Scare" further added to the unpopularity of the Democratic Party, since this global political turmoil produced considerable fear of alien revolutionaries invading the country. Demand in the West for exclusion of Asian immigrants became even stronger than it had been before. Another factor hurting the Democratic Party was the migration of many people from the traditionally Republican Upper Midwest into the state.

Because the West had been the chief presidential battleground ever since the "System of 1896" emerged following that election, Governor Cox traveled across the western states in August and September, but he did not visit Wyoming with its tiny population and poverty of electoral votes. No polls were taken in the state, but a Republican success was universally assumed.

Vote
Like every Mountain state, Wyoming, which had voted strongly for Woodrow Wilson in 1916 – turned very strongly against Cox, who was to lose the state by a two-to-one majority, after Charles Evans Hughes had lost the state by double digits in 1916. Harding carried every county in Wyoming with an absolute majority, and passed sixty percent in all but three. Socialist Eugene Debs was not on the ballot in Wyoming, but Labor candidate Parley Christensen managed double figures in Sheridan County.

This would prove the last time Sweetwater County voted Republican until Richard Nixon's landslide 1972 victory.

Results

Results by county

See also
 United States presidential elections in Wyoming

References

Wyoming
1920
1920 Wyoming elections